Blaise Bontems (15 March 1814 Le Ménil - 1893) was a noted Parisian specialist in the manufacture of automaton singing birds and the first of a dynasty of automaton manufacturers, which included his son Charles Jules and his grandson Lucien. Bontems' birds were famous for the realism of their song.

See also
Automaton
Singing bird box

References

1814 births
1893 deaths